Rosanna Gamson is an American dance choreographer.

Biography 
Rosanna was born in New York city. Learned composition with Bessie Schonberg, Phyllis Lamhut, and Hanya Holm.

References

External links
 Website for Rosanna Gamson/World Wide

Living people
Year of birth missing (living people)
American choreographers